"Pull Shapes" is a single from The Pipettes and was released on 3 July 2006. It was available on CD, double 7" vinyl, and digital download from Memphis Industries. The expression "pull shapes" is a British English colloquialism that refers to the act of dancing.

The video for "Pull Shapes" is a shot-for-shot reenactment of a scene from Beyond the Valley of the Dolls in which the band The Kelly Affair sings "Sweet Talking Candyman."

The song was featured in The L Word, Season 5 Episode 6 ("Lights! Camera! Action!") when Jenny and Adele go shopping. It also features on the soundtrack of the 2008 film  Angus, Thongs and Perfect Snogging.

Billboard named the song #18 on their list of 100 Greatest Girl Group Songs of All Time.

Track listing

CD single
"Pull Shapes"
"Really That Bad"

7" white vinyl single
"Pull Shapes"
"Guess Who Ran Away with the Milkman?"

7" yellow vinyl single
"Pull Shapes"
"Magician Man"

Charts

References

2006 singles
The Pipettes songs
2006 songs
Songs about dancing